Ziegfeld's/Secrets was a dual-themed nightclub in Washington, D.C., with Ziegfeld's featuring drag queens, and Secrets featuring strippers. The entertainment venue first opened in 1980, was forced to close in 2006, then reopened in a new location in 2009.  The second location was closed permanently in 2020.

History
Originally located at 1345 Half Street SE, the circular venue was divided by a wall with a shared bar in the middle and connecting doors.

The Ziegfeld's side of the venue featured a large stage adorned on either side by a giant silver high-heeled shoe. Each weekend on Friday and Saturday drag queen Ella Fitzgerald (née Donnell Robinson), a staple at the venue, hosted her "Ladies of Illusion" for two performances a night (one on Sundays.) The shows lasted approximately an hour and featured five drag queens doing various performances for packed crowds.

On the Secrets side of the venue, there were fully nude male dancers (catering to a mostly gay male crowd). It was one of the few venues in the United States where male strippers are allowed to dance fully nude.

In 2006 the property was seized by the District of Columbia via eminent domain and torn down, along with many other gay-oriented businesses, to make way for the new Nationals Park baseball stadium.

The closing of the bar, compounded with the loss of several nearby LGBTQ businesses, was met with outrage and disappointment. Many were concerned whether the bar could find a new location. Under District law, businesses with a liquor license that permitted nude dancing could only relocate within their current zoning district or in a central business district. The new location would also have restrictions on proximity to residences, churches, and schools.

Second location
Ziegfeld's/Secrets reopened in early 2009 at 1824 Half St., SW, Washington, D.C., a few blocks southwest of its former location. The transfer of its liquor license to the new location was approved, and the club set a "grand opening" date of February 13, 2009.  The nondescript building was all black with a neon pink "Z/S" above the door. The new venue maintained the theme of two connected bars, now divided by two levels: drag performances on the first level, with all-nude male dancers on the second level. Leading lady Ella Fitzgerald continued to perform at Ziegfeld's.

Closure in 2020
While shuttered during the coronavirus pandemic, Ziegfeld's announced the venue had been sold, and the business would not reopen.

See also
 List of strip clubs

References

External links
Official website
"Ballpark Blues" article in "The Washington Post"

LGBT nightclubs in Washington, D.C.
Strip clubs in the United States
Male erotic dance
Defunct LGBT nightclubs in the United States